Holy Trinity Episcopal Academy in Melbourne, Florida is an Episcopal coeducational college-preparatory school for grades preschool – 12th.  It was founded in 1957.  The school operates under the guidance of Holy Trinity Episcopal Church, the Episcopal Diocese of Central Florida and the National Association of Independent Schools.

Structure
The Academy is divided into the Lower School (3-year-old preschool through grade 6) and Upper School (grades 7-12). It has an academic program and an athletic program.

History
Holy Trinity Episcopal Academy was established in 1957 as Holy Trinity Parish Day School. Its founding rector was The Reverend Alex Boyer. In 2000, the school expanded, splitting into a Lower School in the original location and an Upper School (high school) located at a new campus in Pineda, which graduated its first class of seniors in 2003.

The Academy had eight National Merit Scholarship finalists in 2010, highest in the county and double the next closest school.

Athletics

The Pineda Campus has more than 40 athletic teams, Junior High through Varsity.

2015-2016 Holy Trinity Team Athletics
 Fall
 Girls’ Cross Country: District Champion, Region Champion
 Volleyball: District Champion, Region Runner-Up
 Football: District Runner-Up
Baseball: District Champion, Region Runner-Up
 Boys’ Golf: District Runner-Up 
 Varsity Girls’ Swim/Dive: District 3rd Place, Region 4th Place (Highest Finishes in School History) 
 Winter
 Boys’ Basketball: District Champion, Region Champion, State Runner-Up
 Boys’ Soccer: District Champion, Region Champion, State Final Four
 Girls’ Soccer: District Champion, Region Semifinals
 Spring
 Varsity Girls’ Track and Field: District Champion, Region Champion, State Runner-Up
 Varsity Boys’ Tennis: District Champion
 Varsity Girls’ Tennis: District Runner-Up
 Varsity Boys’ Lacrosse: District Runner-Up

State championships 
Holy Trinity Academy's athletic teams have garnered several state championships over the years:
Girls Cross Country 2002, 2003, 2004, 2006, 2009, 2010, 2013, 2014
Boys Cross Country 2004, 2005, 2006, 2008, 2011, 2012, 2013, 2014
Girls Track and Field 2006, 2007, 2011, 2014
Boys Track and Field 2012

Notable alumni
Vicky Hurst, 2008, professional golfer
David Kilgore, 2011, professional runner
Marcus Maye, 2012, safety for the NY Jets.
Stefanie Scott, 2014, non-graduate, actress
Kate Upton, 2010, non-graduate, professional model

See also
Holy Trinity Episcopal Church Parish (Melbourne, Florida)

References

External links
School Website

Educational institutions established in 1957
Private elementary schools in Florida
Private high schools in Florida
Buildings and structures in Melbourne, Florida
Private middle schools in Florida
Episcopal schools in the United States
High schools in Brevard County, Florida
1957 establishments in Florida